Maco Toys, Inc., was the name of a popular toy company based in Brooklyn, New York which produced war-themed toys for children in the 1950s and 1960s. Their toys were sold in a catalog that was illustrated by Tony Tallarico and printed by Charlton Comics which presented itself as a war comic book. (These toys were also sold in toy stores.) Products included plastic guns (including the M1903 Springfield rifle and an Army Paratrooper Carbine ), grenades, and a plastic Molotov cocktail.

The company's products were available in stores throughout the United States, but had a limited range of products and did not operate in other countries.  Competitors included Hawk Model Company, Applause Inc, and Louis Marx and Company.

Anti gun toy controversy

In 1955, the New York City Council passed a bill to ban the manufacture, sale or possession of imitation revolvers that resemble the real article too closely.  In a debate about the measure, an Army .45 caliber automatic manufactured by Maco was used as an example of a toy gun which was similar enough to the real model to be used as a weapon in a robbery.

External links
 Company information from the Truly Awful Stuff blog
 Catalog information from Comic Book Resources

References

Defunct companies based in New York (state)
Toy companies of the United States
Toy controversies
Companies based in New York City
Gun politics in the United States
Toy weapons